Oh My Goddess!, the manga by Kōsuke Fujishima, has been adapted into five anime versions between 1993 and 2007, including an original video animation (OVA), The Adventures of Mini-Goddess, Ah! My Goddess, and its sequels, Ah! My Goddess: Flights of Fancy and Ah! My Goddess: Fighting Wings.

In 1993, Anime International Company produced a five-episode OVA series based on the manga series. Its success inspired a spinoff TV series entitled The Adventures of Mini-Goddess. Produced by Oriental Light and Magic and initially aired on WOWOW in 1998 and 1999, the plot revolved around the adventures of three miniaturized goddesses and their rat companion Gan-chan, all of whom live in a temple home. In 2005, Tokyo Broadcasting System (TBS) began broadcasting Ah! My Goddess, a new series directed by Hiroaki Gōda and animated by Anime International Company. It ran for 24 episodes between January 7 and July 8, 2005. A sequel also animated by Anime International Company and directed by Gōda, Ah! My Goddess: Flights of Fancy, aired on TBS between April 6 and September 14, 2006. A two-episode special entitled Ah! My Goddess: Fighting Wings, animated by Anime International Company and directed by Gōda, was broadcast on TBS on December 9, 2007.

Each series was licensed to a different American publisher. AnimEigo received the rights to publish the OVA in Region 1 and released five VHS tapes and two DVDs. The Adventures of Mini-Goddess was licensed to Geneon Entertainment (under their old name, Pioneer Entertainment) and was released to four DVDs. Ah! My Goddess was licensed by Media Blasters, who released all 26 episodes on 6 DVD compilations. However, Media Blasters declined the sequel (Ah! My Goddess: Flights of Fancy); it was instead licensed to ADV Films, who released six DVD compilations. and then to Funimation, who later released a boxset in November 25, 2008. Thirteen pieces of theme music are used in the different series: four opening themes and nine ending themes. The Japanese production companies or the holders of the licenses in Region 1 released several soundtracks and drama CDs as well.


OVA series

First series
From late 1993 to early 1994, the  original video animation series was produced by Anime International Company, featuring the central characters of Kosuke Fujishima's Oh My Goddess! series. It is distributed by Pony Canyon in Japan and by AnimEigo in North America. The English dub was produced by Coastal Carolina Studios. The storyline initially parallels the early parts of the original manga and is similar to early episodes of the later 2005 TV series; the first three episodes of the OVA cover the same story as episodes one through ten of the 2005 series. However, episodes four and five do not follow the manga or any other TV series.

The series was initially released straight to VHS between February 21, 1993 and May 17, 1994. It was reissued twice in North America on VHS and LaserDisc format: once between June 29, 1994 and August 31, 1994 and again between May 29, 1996 and June 28, 1996. It was also released to two DVDs on August 14, 2001 and October 9, 2001 respectively.

Both the opening theme, and the ending theme, "Congratulations", are sung by the Goddess Family Club.

Ah! My Goddess (2011)
episode 1 bundled with manga vol. 42 special edition
episode 2 bundled with manga vol. 43 special edition
episode 3 released prior bundled with manga vol. 46

Three pieces of music themes was used. "Everlasting" by FripSide used as the opening theme song. For episodes 1 and 2 "Friendship" (友情, Yuujou) and episode 3 "THIS LOVE" sung by the Goddess Family Club are the closing theme song.

Television series

The Adventures of Mini-Goddess

The Adventures of Mini-Goddess, or, when literally translated from its original Japanese title, Ah! My Goddess: Being Small is Convenient, is a Japanese animated TV series and that had 48 episodes aired during its run from 1998 to 1999. It was directed by Hiroko Kazui and Yasuhiro Matsumura and was produced by Oriental Light and Magic. It premiered as a part of the omnibus show Anime Complex on WOWOW. In Region 1, it was licensed to and distributed by Geneon Entertainment, formerly known as Pioneer Entertainment. The series does not follow the manga closely; instead, it describes the adventures of the miniaturized three goddesses and their rat companion Gan-chan, who live in their temple home.

In Japan, the season was released by Pony Canyon on both DVD and VHS. Six VHS tapes were released between December 18, 1998 and October 20, 1999. Later, six DVDs were released between May 19, 1999 and October 20, 1999. A boxed set was released to Japan on February 20, 2008. For Region 1, the season was licensed to Geneon Entertainment, under the name Pioneer Entertainment. They released the season to four DVD compilations, each containing 12 episodes, between February and August 2002. Like Pony Canyon, Geneon Entertainment released a limited-edition boxed set of the DVDs on July 1, 2003.

The Adventures of Mini-Goddess has two pieces of theme music, both of which are ending themes.  by Yuki Ishii served as the ending theme for episodes 1–24, and "XXX (Kiss Kiss Kiss)" by Splash! served as the ending theme for episodes 25–48.

Ah! My Goddess

The episodes of the Japanese anime television series Ah! My Goddess are directed by Hiroaki Gōda, animated by Anime International Company, and produced by Tokyo Broadcasting System (TBS) and Kodansha. The series focuses on the beginning of the manga series, when Keiichi summons Belldandy and wishes for her to remain with him forever and uses material from the first 20 volumes of the series over 24 episodes.

The season began in Japan, on TBS, on January 7, 2005, and ended on July 8, 2005. Bandai Visual released eight DVD compilations in Japan between April and November 2005, each containing three episodes. The two OVAs, which had not been broadcast, were released on a special DVD on December 23, 2005. The English adaptation is licensed by Media Blasters, who released all 26 episodes on 6 DVD compilations between September 2005 and July 2006, to Region 1.

Each episode uses two pieces of theme music, one opening theme and one of two closing themes.  by Yoko Ishida was used as the opening theme for every episode.

Ah! My Goddess: Flights of Fancy

The episodes of the Japanese anime television series Ah! My Goddess: Everyone Has Wings, officially named Ah! My Goddess: Flights of Fancy in North America, are directed by Hiroaki Gōda, animated by Anime International Company, and produced by TBS and Kodansha. Like its predecessor, the anime does not follow the manga chronologically. The plot follows the adventures of Keiichi and Belldandy in the aftermath of the Lord of Terror fiasco.

It premiered on TBS on April 6, 2006 and concluded on September 14, 2006, continuing the storyline from season one. Season two concluded with episode 22, although the Japanese and North American DVD releases include episodes 23 and 24. It was released to DVD in Japan between July 2006 and February 2007 by Bandai Visual. Media Blasters, who released the first season, declined to produce this season; it was licensed to ADV Films instead. ADV Films released the season on six DVD compilations, each containing four episodes, between May and March 2007. The rights were then transferred to Funimation, who released a boxed set on November 25, 2007.

The episodes featured three pieces of theme music: one opening theme and two closing themes.  by Yoko Ishida served as the opening theme song.

Ah! My Goddess: Fighting Wings
Ah! My Goddess: Fighting Wings by Aya Yanagi is a two-episode special that commemorates the 20th anniversary of the original publication of Oh My Goddess!. It was directed by Hiroaki Gōda, animated by Anime International Company, and produced by TBS and Kodansha. The episodes aired on December 8, 2007. Bandai Visual released the episodes to a single DVD in Japan on February 22, 2008. The episodes, however, have yet to be licensed and released to Region 1.

Both the opening theme, and the closing theme, are played by Jyukai.

Note
A.  Episode 12.5 was not included in the English DVD releases and consequently has no official U.S. title. In addition, the episode is not officially numbered but was aired between episodes 12 and 13.

References